This is a list of grammatical cases as they are used by various inflectional languages that have declension.

This list will mark the case, when it is used, an example of it, and then finally what language(s) the case is used in.

Place and time
Note: Most cases used for location and motion can be used for time as well.

Location

Motion from

Motion to

Motion via

Time

Chart for review for the basic cases

Morphosyntactic alignment
For meanings of the terms agent, patient, experiencer, and instrument, see thematic relation.

Relation

Semantics

State

References

Grammatical cases

eo:Kazo
sk:Pád (jazykoveda)